Yerassyl Kaiyrbek (born 3 December 1996) is a Kazakhstani taekwondo practitioner. In 2018, he won one of the bronze medals in the men's 68 kg event at the 2018 Asian Games held in Jakarta, Indonesia.

In 2013, he won one of the bronze medals in the boys' 53 kg event at the 2013 Asian Youth Games held in Nanjing, China. In 2014, he represented Kazakhstan at the 2014 Asian Games held in Incheon, South Korea in the men's 63 kg event where he was eliminated in his first match by Lee Dae-hoon of South Korea.

References

External links 
 

Living people
1996 births
Place of birth missing (living people)
Kazakhstani male taekwondo practitioners
Taekwondo practitioners at the 2014 Asian Games
Taekwondo practitioners at the 2018 Asian Games
Medalists at the 2018 Asian Games
Asian Games bronze medalists for Kazakhstan
Asian Games medalists in taekwondo
21st-century Kazakhstani people